A Legionnaire (French: Un de la légion) is a 1936 French comedy adventure film directed by Christian-Jaque and starring Fernandel, Robert Le Vigan and Daniel Mendaille.

The film's sets were designed by the art director Pierre Schild. Location shooting took place in Marseille and Sidi Bel Abbès.

Plot
A hen-pecked husband finds his life turned upside down, when he is accidentally enlisted in the French Foreign Legion. He is sent to fight in Algeria.

Cast
 Fernandel as Fernand Espitalion  
 Robert Le Vigan as Leduc  
 Daniel Mendaille as Charlin  
 Arthur Devère as Vandercleef  
 Rolla Norman as Carron  
 Thérèse Dorny as Antoinette Espitalion  
 Jacques Varennes as Durand  
 Paul Amiot as Le colonel  
 Jean Kolb as Le médecin-chef  
 Suzy Prim as Maryse  
 Paul Azaïs as Turlot 
 Régine Dancourt as L'amie de Pierrot 
 Georges Malkine as Le légionnaire russe  
 Eugène Stuber as Un légionnaire  
 Marcel Vidal as Maître Troude

References

Bibliography 
 Andrews, Dudley. Mists of Regret: Culture and Sensibility in Classic French Film. Princeton University Press, 1995.

External links 
 

1936 films
French adventure comedy films
1930s adventure comedy films
1930s French-language films
Films directed by Christian-Jaque
Films set in Algeria
Films set in deserts
French black-and-white films
Films about the French Foreign Legion
Films scored by Casimir Oberfeld
1936 comedy films
1930s French films